The Royal Selangor Golf Club is a golf course in Kuala Lumpur, Malaysia. Established in 1893, it is one of the oldest golf clubs in Asia. The club is open only to members. Its entrance is located at the intersection of Jalan Raja Chulan and Jalan Tun Razak, the latter of which runs along the length of the club. It has two 18-hole championship courses, the Old Course and the New Course, and a 9-hole course.

In 2006, the club had a multi-million ringgit renovation and upgrading.

Tournaments
The Malaysian Open was held at Royal Selangor almost every year from its inauguration in 1962 through to 1986. The tournament returned in 1993 and 1994, and again in 2002, when it was part of both the European Tour and Asian Tour. The tours revisited in 2016, with the inaugural Maybank Championship Malaysia.

In 1978, the club hosted the LPGA Tour's Colgate Far East Open. Between 1988 and 1992, the Malaysian Masters, which was an Australasian Tour event for its final two years, was played at Royal Selangor.

In 1961, the first edition of the Putra Cup was held at the golf club. This was the first international tournament hosted in the state of Selangor. Teams from Burma, Hong Kong, Indonesia, Malaysia, Singapore, Thailand and Vietnam participated in the tournament. In 2006, the club held a royal competition that was hosted by the 12th Yang di-Pertuan Agong, HM Tuanku Syed Sirajuddin, 7th Raja of Perlis.

See also
List of golf clubs granted Royal status

References

External links

Official website

1893 establishments in British Malaya
Golf clubs and courses in Malaysia
Sports venues in Kuala Lumpur
Organisations based in Malaysia with royal patronage
Royal golf clubs